The Polistinae is a subfamily of eusocial wasps belonging to the family Vespidae. They are closely related to the more familiar  wasps (“yellowjackets” as they are called in North America) and true hornets of the subfamily Vespinae, containing four tribes. With about 1,100 species total, it is the second-most diverse subfamily within the Vespidae, and while most species are tropical or subtropical, they include some of the most frequently encountered large wasps in temperate regions.

The Polistinae are also known as paper wasps, which is a misleading term, since other wasps (including the wasps in the subfamily Vespinae) also build nests out of paper, and because some epiponine wasps (e.g., Polybia emaciata) build theirs out of mud, nonetheless, the name "paper wasp" seems to apply mostly, but not exclusively, to the Polistinae, especially the Polistini.

Many polistines, such as Polistes fuscatus, Polistes annularis, and Polistes exclamans, make their nests out of paper. Polistes annularis suspends its paper nests from cliff overhangs via a pedicel, whose free fatty acids induce the necrophobic response in ants and causes them to avoid the pedicel rather than cross and prey on the nest’s inhabitants. Polistes metricus foragers take off from their nests as if they already know how long their trip is. For short flights, they exit the nest flying horizontally, while for long flights they exit the nest flying straight up into a high altitude before pursuing their direction. Polistine brood cells are arranged in a hexagonal array, similar to the comb structure in a honey bee nest. Some species of the epiponine genera Polybia and Brachygastra store honey in the comb, among the few insects other than bees to store honey (also some ants store honey in their bodies).

Characteristics
Characteristics of the Polistinae are:

 The queens (reproductive females) are morphologically similar to workers, though sometimes slightly larger or differently colored.
 The abdomen is spindle-shaped, often petiolate.
 The antennae of males are curled.
 The nest is sometimes open (the nests of vespines are always enclosed in several layers of paper).

Colony life cycle 

Polistine wasps found colonies in one of two ways. In some species, nests are founded by a small number of reproductive females, possibly a single one. One of the foundresses eventually acquires dominance over the other and is the sole reproducer. The nest is open (not enclosed by an envelope) and contains a single comb.

In the other group, called "swarm-founding", the nest is founded by a large number of workers and a few queens. It is usually protected by an envelope, like a vespine nest.

Selected species of Polistinae 

Tribe Polistini
 Genus Polistes
 P. adelphus
 P. annularis
 P. atrimandibularis
 P. bellicosus
 P. biglumis
 P. bischoffi
 P. carolina - red paper wasp
 P. chinensis - Chinese paper wasp
 P. dominula - European paper wasp
 P. fuscatus - northern paper wasp
 P. humilis - common paper wasp
 P. instabilis
 P. japonicus
 P. metricus - Metric paper wasp
 P. semenowi
 P. sulcifer
 P. tepidus

Tribe Mischocyttarini
 Genus Mischocyttarus
 M. collarellus
 M. flavitarsis
 M. labiatus
 Mischocyttarus drewseni

Tribe Epiponini
 Genus Agelaia
 A. multipicta
 Genus Apoica
 A. pallens
 A. pallida
 Genus Brachygastra
B. lecheguana
B. mellifica
 Genus Leipomeles
 L. dorsata
Genus Parachartergus
P. colobopterus
 Genus Polybia
 P. dimidiata
 P. emaciata
 P. occidentalis
 P. scutellaris
 P. sericea
 Genus Synoeca
 S. chalibea (often misspelled as chalybea)
 S. cyanea
 S. septentrionalis
 S. surinama
 S. virginea

Tribe Ropalidiini
 Genus Ropalidia
 R. marginata
 R. revolutionalis
 R. romandi

References

External links
Social Behavior of Polistine Wasps
Article on Australian Paper Wasps
Nest defence behavior in two species of Polybia
Ropalidia marginata a primitive eusocial wasp
Iconography of the Vespidae of the World 

Vespidae